"Inside Your Dreams" is a song recorded by German act U96, released in 1994 as a non-album track. It was a major hit on the charts in Europe, peaking at number-one in Finland. Additionally, it was a top 10 hit in Austria and Switzerland, and a top 20 hit in Denmark and Germany. On the Eurochart Hot 100, it reached number 29 in May 1994. Outside Europe, the single was a huge hit in Israel, peaking at number four. The accompanying music video was directed by Swedish director Fredrik Boklund, known for his videos for Army of Lovers. It was A-listed on Germany's VIVA in April 1994.

Track listing
 CD maxi, Europe (1994)
"Inside Your Dreams" (Video Version) – 3:28
"Inside Your Dreams" (Phase 1) – 7:52
"Inside Your Dreams" (Phase 2) – 8:21 

 CD maxi (Remixes I), Europe (1994)
"Inside Your Dreams" (Damage Control Remix) – 5:35
"Inside Your Dreams" (Intermission Remix) – 6:27
"Inside Your Dreams" (Ambient Phase 3) – 6:00

 CD maxi (Remixes II), Germany (1994)
"Inside Your Dreams" (Dumping Mix) – 6:16
"Inside Your Dreams" (Catania Remix) – 6:06

Charts

Weekly charts

Year-end charts

References

 

1994 singles
1994 songs
English-language German songs
Logic Records singles
Music videos directed by Fredrik Boklund
Number-one singles in Finland
Song recordings produced by Alex Christensen
Songs written by Alex Christensen
U96 songs